Liu Xiaoguang (born 20 March 1960) is a professional Go player.

Biography
He started playing Go at the age of 13 and became a 6 dan professional in 1982. In 1988, he was awarded 9 dan by the Zhongguo Qiyuan. Liu defeated four Japanese professionals in the 3rd China-Japan Supermatches.

Titles and runners-up 

Ranks #8 in total number of titles in China.

References 

1960 births
Living people
Chinese Go players
People from Kaifeng
Sportspeople from Henan